Great Clarendon Street is one of the principal thoroughfares of the Jericho district of Oxford, England, an inner suburb northwest of the centre of the city.

At the northeast end of the street is a junction with Walton Street. Opposite is Freud's, a cafe in a former church building constructed in the classical style. To the south is the Oxford University Press, which also houses the Oxford University Press Museum. The southwest end of the street ends near the Oxford Canal, just past the junction with Canal Street.

Many of the houses here were built in the first half of the 19th century. In the early 19th century, Grey Coat's (University) School was located here. The street was named in 1890–1. The street is named after the Clarendon Press (aka, the Oxford University Press) of Oxford University, which moved to Jericho in 1830.

See also
 Little Clarendon Street, a nearby shopping street

References

1890 establishments in England
Streets in Oxford
Oxford University Press